James McNaughton (born December 11, 1987 in Newmarket, Ontario) is a Canadian Olympic bobsledder.

References

1987 births
Living people
Olympic bobsledders of Canada
Canadian male bobsledders
Sportspeople from Newmarket, Ontario
Sportspeople from Ontario
Bobsledders at the 2014 Winter Olympics